In the Dungeons & Dragons fantasy role-playing game, the term monster refers to a variety of creatures, some adapted from folk myths and legends and others invented specifically for the game. Included are traditional monsters such as dragons, supernatural creatures such as ghosts, and mundane or fantastic animals.  Monsters are typically used as obstacles which the players must overcome to progress through the game. Beginning with the first edition in 1974, a bestiary was included along other game manuals, first called Monsters & Treasure and now commonly known as the Monster Manual. As an essential part of Dungeons & Dragons, many of the game's monsters have become iconic in their own right, becoming influential to video games, fiction, and popular culture.

Origins

Inspiration for the monsters of Dungeons & Dragons includes mythology, medieval bestiaries, science-fiction, fantasy literature, and film. Mauricio Rangel Jiménez goes so far to say that a basic knowledge of mythology, religion and fantasy is required to keep pace with the game. In game books, monsters are typically presented with illustrations, game statistics, and a detailed description. Monsters may be adapted to fit the needs of the game's writers and publishers, such as by describing combat abilities that may have been absent or only implied by an original source.

Because of their broad, inclusive background, D&D monsters have been called a pastiche of sources. In some cases, this has resulted in legal battles, such as when names taken from the works of J.R.R. Tolkien had to be changed due to copyright disputes.

Influence and criticism
The monsters of Dungeons & Dragons have significantly influenced modern fantasy fiction, ranging from licensed fiction to how monsters are portrayed in fantasy fiction generally. The scope of this influence has been compared to the works of J. R. R. Tolkien. In a 2005 interview, author China Miéville stated,

References and homages to Dungeons & Dragons monsters can be found in works such as Adventure Time, and the game's monsters have inspired tributes that both celebrate and mock various creatures. A 2013 io9 retrospective detailed memorable monsters, and in 2018 SyFy Wire published a list of "The 9 Scariest, Most Unforgettable Monsters From Dungeons & Dragons", and in the same year Screen Rant published a list of the game's "10 Most Powerful (And 10 Weakest) Monsters, Ranked". Other writers have highlighted the game's more odd or eccentric creations, such as in the article "Dungeons & Dragons: Celebrating 30 Years of Very Stupid Monsters", Geek.com's list of "The most underrated monsters of Advanced Dungeons & Dragons", The Escapist's list of "The Dumbest Dungeons & Dragons Monsters Ever (And How To Use Them)", and Cracked.com's "15 Idiotic Dungeons and Dragons Monsters".

The monsters of Dungeons & Dragons have received criticism from multiple sources. In addition to other game elements, the presence of magical or demonic monsters has provoked moral panics among religious conservatives. The game's emphasis on slaying monsters has also elicited negative commentary. As monsters have traditionally been defined by the amount of "experience points" they award when killed, the game has been said to promote a "sociopathic" violence where the dungeon master "merely referees one imagined slaughter after another." Nicholas J. Mizer, in contrast, suggested that experience through combat was an in-game variation on Thorstein Veblen's theory that application of the "predatory spirit" of humans to warfare could lead to high standing in society.

Some female monsters, such as the nymph and succubus, were seen by Philip J. Clements as an instance of the sexist tropes the game draws on which presented female sexuality as inherently dangerous.

Monster types
Many kinds of monsters can be classified into typologies based on their common characteristics, and various books and game guides have been produced focusing on specific kinds of monsters. Such groupings include humanoids, monstrosities, dragons, giants, undead, aberrations, fiends, celestials, fey, elementals, constructs, oozes and plants; and beasts. There is some flexibility within these groupings. For example, many kinds of creatures can become undead or can be used to form magical constructs.

The 3rd edition of the game also used a broader type named "outsiders", encompassing any creature from the Outer Planes or Inner Planes.

Notable monsters

TSR 2009 – Monster Manual (1977)
The Monster Manual (1977) was the initial monster book for the first edition of the Advanced Dungeons & Dragons game, published in 1977. Gary Gygax wrote much of the work himself, having included and expanded most of the monsters from the previous D&D supplements. Also included are monsters originally printed in The Strategic Review, as well as some originally found in early issues of The Dragon and other early game materials. This book expanded on the original monster format by including the stat lines on the same page as the monsters' descriptions and introducing more stats, expanding the length of most monster descriptions, and featuring illustrations for most of the monsters. The book contains a treasure chart and an index of major listings.

TSR 2012 – Fiend Folio (1981)
The Fiend Folio: Tome of Creatures Malevolent and Benign was the second monster book for the first edition of Advanced Dungeons & Dragons, published in 1981. The Fiend Folio consisted mostly of monsters submitted to White Dwarf'''s "Fiend Factory" column.   The monsters in this book are presented in the same format as those in the previous Monster Manual work, and most featured illustrations of the monsters

TSR 2016 – Monster Manual II (1983)Monster Manual II was the third and final monster book for the first edition of Advanced Dungeons & Dragons, published in 1983, and has the largest page count of the three. As with the Monster Manual, this book was written primarily by Gary Gygax. This book contains a number of monsters that previously appeared in limited circulation and a large amount of its contents was entirely new at publication. The monsters in this book are presented in the same format as the Monster Manual and Fiend Folio.

FiendsFiend is a term used in the Dungeons & Dragons fantasy role-playing game to refer to any malicious otherworldly creatures within the Dungeons & Dragons universe. These include various races of demons and devils that are of an evil alignment and hail from the Lower Planes. All fiends are extraplanar outsiders.

Most common types

Demons
The most widespread race of fiends are the demons, a chaotic evil race native to the Abyss; they are rapacious, cruel and arbitrary. The dominant race of demons is the tanar'ri . The Abyss and its population are both theoretically infinite in size. "True" tanar'ri such as the balors (originally called Balrogs) and the six-armed serpentine mariliths push other weaker tanar'ri around and organise them into makeshift armies for battle. Demon lords and demon princes such as Orcus, Demogorgon, Juiblex, Zuggtmoy, Graz'zt, and countless others rule over the demons of their individual layers of the Abyss, in as much as the chaotic demons can be ruled over.

Devils
The devils, of which the ruling type are called baatezu , are lawful evil natives of the Nine Hells of Baator; they subjugate the weak and rule tyrannically over their domains. Pit fiends are the most powerful baatezu, though even the strongest pit fiends are surpassed by the Lords of the Nine, or Archdevils, whose ranks include Baalzebul, Mephistopheles, and Asmodeus. Unlike the demons, the devils arranged themselves through a strict hierarchy. Like the demons, the devils are scheming backstabbers; while a demon only keeps its words when it is convenient for it, a devil keeps its word all too well; though being used to exploiting repressive bureaucratic machinations to the fullest, always knows all ways around the letter of a contract to begin with. The tanar'ri and the baatezu hold an eternal enmity for one another and wage the Blood War against one another.

Yugoloths
The yugoloths (called daemons in 1st edition D&D) are neutral evil natives of the Bleak Eternity of Gehenna and the Gray Wastes of Hades; they are neutral to the affairs of the other fiendish races, interfering only when they see a situation that may be profitable or a potential for the advancement of their own schemes. The yugoloths are manipulative, secretive, and mercenary by nature, often acting as soldiers for deities in their own private wars, or even at times aiding both sides of the Blood War. In 4th Edition, the yugoloths are considered to be demons, and their previously standard naming convention of "loth" is replaced by "demon" (Ex. the Mezzoloth is the 4e Mezzodemon). In fifth edition, yugoloths are listed as neutral evil fiends under their original names.

Other fiends

Demodands
The demodands are race of evil fiends that live on the plane of Carceri (Tarterus in 1st edition D&D). Demodands were introduced in the 1st edition supplement Monster Manual II, renamed as gehreleths in the 2nd edition Monstrous Compendium Outer Planes Appendix, and reintroduced as demodands in the 3rd edition sourcebook Fiend Folio. In 1st edition D&D, the three types of demodands from weakest to strongest were tarry, slime, and shaggy. In 2nd and 3rd editions, the three types are farastu, kelubar, and shator.

Hordlings
The hordlings are fiends that form the hordes of the Gray Waste of Hades. They first appeared in the 1st edition supplement Monster Manual II. Hordlings wander the Gray Waste preying upon everything they come across, even other hordlings. Hordlings vary greatly in appearance. It is said that hordlings evolved from larvae whose hatred was so unique, their souls became individual. The hordlings can be summoned using an artifact known as the Bringer of Doom, which was created around the time of the Invoked Devastation of Greyhawk. Hordlings are the most common inhabitants of the Gray Waste. They also occasionally roam the other Lower Planes as well.

Kython
The kythons (not to be confused with kytons, which are chain devils Baatezu) are distinct from the other fiends in that they did not originate on any of the lower planes. When a group of fiends (the Galchutt, from Monte Cook's Chaositech and Ptolus) were trapped on the Material Plane, they tried creating more of their own kind through magical means. The results were eyeless reptilian creatures with insectoid traits and neutral evil traits. As the kythons matured, they took on varied forms. None of them were loyal to the fiends that created them. Because kythons originated on the Material Plane instead of the Abyss (or another lower plane), they are also called earth-bound demons. Kythons are only interested in eating and breeding. They have spread rapidly across the Material Plane. The current hierarchy of kythons, from the weakest to the strongest is: broodlings, juveniles, adults, impalers, slaymasters, and slaughterkings. Eventually, with more time, kythons will grow into newer and more powerful forms. Kythons closely resemble xenomorphs. They were originally created for Monte Cook's Ptolus campaign, based on some gaming miniatures he had bought, and were added by him to the Book of Vile Darkness absent the context of the Galchutt, who did not appear until later on in Chaositech.

Cook originally planned on perhaps renaming them so their name was not quite so similar to kytons, or chain devils, as well as other episodes of Cook's Ptolus campaign to see how they were originally used.

Night hags
Night hags are fiends from the Gray Wastes of Hades that traffic in the souls of mortals in 3rd edition sources. In 5th edition they come from the Feywild and are exiled to the Gray Wastes of Hades.

Rakshasas
Rakshasas are fiends (often tiger-headed) that may have originated on Acheron according to 3rd edition sources. In 5th edition they originated in the Nine Hells.

Slaad
In the 4th edition game, Slaadi are chaotic evil and originate out of the Elemental Chaos. This is markedly different from the portrayal of Slaadi in all prior editions of the game, when they were chaotic neutral natives of Limbo and thus not fiends.

Half-fiends and fiendish creatures
The cambions (whose name comes from a different kind of mythological, demonic creature) are simply half-fiends; hybrids of fiends and non-fiendish creatures, often humans or other humanoids. Cambions are typically created through fiends raping mortals or seducing them after shape-shifting, although some of the most depraved beings actually participate willingly. Those cambions that actually survive birth typically look like grotesque, hellish variants of their mortal progenitors, having wings, claws, fangs and often many other features that reveal their fiendish origins. Cambions are usually outcast, being feared and hated in mortal societies for their fiendish origins and being derided by pure-blooded fiends for their impure heritage. A variant of cambion called durzagon is described in Monster Manual II and is the hybrid of a devil and an unsuspecting duergar. The fiendish creatures are simply fiendish versions of other species in Dungeons & Dragons. They typically look like fearsome travesties of beings from the Material Plane. Most fiendish species are divided into a number of variants, usually in a hierarchy of increasing power and cunning.

Other fiends not associated with a specific group
Abominations – (Chichimec, phane, infernal, dream larva, phaethon, xixecal, hecatoncheires) – the unwanted offspring of deities.
Abyssal drake – the result of an ancient breeding program that combines the nastiest elements of demons, wyverns, and red dragons. From the Abyss plane.
Achaierai – Massive evil, clever, and predatory flightless birds with a distinct taste for torture. Of the Acheron plane.
Avari – Man-sized, batlike fiends that are the chief rivals of yugoloths for territory. They are neither as powerful or as numerous as the fiends and have lost much over time. Long ago, avari dwelt in a large central community, but their many wars shattered their unity, forcing them to live in isolated clans in desolate areas of the planes. They dwell there in dank caverns filled with bats, and inhabit similar environs when found on the Material Plane. Of the Gehenna plane.
Ba'atun – Vicious, white-winged primate-like creatures that find death and destruction as their constant companions. Their origin is surrounded in mystery – perhaps they were demons made from snow, perhaps they are exiles from a frozen realm, or perhaps they have always been here, lurking. Their home plane is unknown.
Barghest – Lupine fiend that resembles a goblin-wolf hybrid with terrible jaws and sharp claws, feeds on blood and souls to grow stronger. Of the Gehenna plane.
Broodfiend – Almost headless, grotesque mix of worm, lizard, bat, and ape, created by avolakias to serve Kyuss.
Diakk (carcene and varath) – Evil flightless birds of the Carceri plane.
Diurge – Gray-skinned, red-eyed denizens of a nightmare realm known as Darkrealm, a nightmarishly twisted version of a Material Plane world. Diurges live to serve the evil lords of Darkrealm, but are occasionally ordered to travel to the Material Plane to spread chaos. These beings are extremely sadistic, hating everything that lives, and willing to manipulate anyone in the process of achieving their goals. They are horrible conquerors, subjugating other life forms ruthlessly, and causing pain wherever they go. Their lack of individual greed enables them to better work together towards this common goal.
Dune stalker – Fiends summoned to Material Plane to kill targets or carry out other quests. Of the Gray Waste of Hades plane.
Ebon aspect – An abomination to not only all that is true and just in the world, but also to the traditional faith of the worshipers of Erythnul, Hextor, and Venca. Appear in the lands haunted by the Ebon Triad.
Hassitor – Extinct exemplar race of Acheron plane.
Hellchain weaver – Eight-legged mass of chains made entirely of cruel hooks, barbed chains, and jagged iron. Of the Nine Hells of Baator plane.
Maelephant – Elephant-headed fiends originally created by powerful baatezu lords to serve as guardians, many run free since their lords were deposed.
Mapmaker – Humanoid lizardkin with weaselish features. Of the Pandemonium plane.
Marrashi – Disease spreader that resembles a winged gnoll.
Nightmare (includes cauchemar and lesser) – Proud equine creatures with hearts as black and evil as the dark abysses from which they come. Of the Gray Waste plane.
Nimicri – A unique vast creature that mimics a town that can duplicate creatures if a single drop of their blood touches it. Of the Gehenna plane.
Shadowlands oni
Sugo – Flattish brown disks with suckered tentacles. Of the Acheron plane.
Tener – Spindly, bipedal arachnoid; greed incarnate. Of the Pandemonium plane.
Utukku – Lion-headed scaled fiends that kill all outsiders who pass through their territory, including others of their kind. Their lairs in the great ash deserts of Carceri always include impressive defenses, as each utukku must defend itself from all competitors. Utukku want no part of the intrigues of other fiends, and prey on any demons and devils they meet.
Vaath – A creature of pure sadism that delights in both physical and emotional pain. Of the Carceri plane.
Vaporighu – Petty, sadistic, and voracious blobs of hideous, bloated, waddling hairy flesh. Of the Gehenna plane.
Viltch – Resembles a dirty gray, three-legged mandrill; destroys beauty and order. Of the Pandemonium plane.
Vorr – A hateful canine of the Abyss.
Wirchler – A disembodied mouth with two arms. Of the Gehenna plane.
Yeth hound – Fearsome flying hounds with frightening bays. Of the Gray Waste.
Yochlol - Arachnid handmaiden of the goddess Lolth in the forgotten realms legendarium. Sometimes appears as melted wax or a tentacled misshapen monster.

Hecatoncheires
The hecatoncheires in the game is based on the creature with the same name from Greek mythology. Like their counterparts, D&D's hecatoncheires were presented as giants with one-hundred arms and fifty heads in early editions. They also had the ability to throw a whole "barrage of boulders" at their enemies. In later editions their description was changed to "abominations that are formed from the fusion of one-hundred beings." In another version they were reduced in power, appearing as "a mere four-armed giant".
They were considered among the deadliest monsters of D&D by several reviewers. Marley King from ScreenRant recommended the hecatoncheires for Dungeons Masters to pit against high-level parties as a monster that is not "too cliché". He commented - aside from the monsters many attacks, and high perception - it got was given "incredible martial prowess" in the game, hearkening back to the importance of skill in battle in the culture it was taken from. Nicholas Montegriffo from The Gamer called them "worthy foes for epic heroes" and found the down-scaling of offensively usable arms sad.

Controversy and related changes between editions
The inclusion of demons and devils proved controversial among critics of Dungeons & Dragons. TSR eliminated most references to occult symbols, demons, and devils from the second edition of the game. When the creatures were reintroduced in the Monstrous Compendium supplement MC8: The Outer Planes, the terms "baatezu", "tanar'ri", "yugoloth", and "gehreleth" were introduced and were used exclusively in place of the terms "devil", "demon", "daemon", and "demodand", respectively.

Following a more relaxed attitude towards the hobby, Wizards of the Coast reinserted many of these excised references in the third edition of the game. They kept intact the terms they had been replaced with, using both when applicable to appeal both to older players and those who played in subsequent editions of the game. While the 1st edition of AD&D used the term "Daemon", all subsequent editions beginning with 2nd edition have used the term "yugoloth" for the same creatures.

Reception
Fiends were considered among the "standard repertoire of 'Monsters'" in the game by Fabian Perlini-Pfister.Fabian Perlini-Pfister uses the word "demon" instead of fiend, but uses "Asmodeus and succubi" as examples.

Blood War
The Blood War concept was introduced as part of the new background for the outer planes in 1991's Monstrous Compendium Volume Outer Planes Appendix. The conflict is depicted as a bitter war of annihilation between the baatezu race and the tanar'ri; an absolute, all encompassing, and virtually eternal struggle.  Trenton Webb of Arcane magazine wrote, "the fate of all the planes hangs on its outcome".  The Blood War was thoroughly detailed in various books throughout the Planescape setting, particularly the 1996 boxed set Hellbound: The Blood War.  The 4th edition of D&D's Manual of the Planes updated the Blood War into a smoldering cold war that was formerly an all-out war.

The Blood War has been given various causes across different game books.  Fiendish Codex I: Hordes of the Abyss attributes it to an offshoot of the primordial battles between law and chaos, continued out of violent and sadistic stubbornness.  Fiendish Codex II: Tyrants of the Nine Hells depicts Asmodeus as a formerly angelic being tasked with fighting an eternal war against the demons. When he and his followers take on demonic traits to better combat their foes, these angels, now deemed devils, are either exiled to or granted (depending on perspective) their own plane, where they fight the Blood War without disturbing the primordial lords of order. This is depicted as possibly being self-serving historical revisionism.  The Guide to Hell instead portrays the Blood War as a distraction by Asmodeus to hide his true goal of usurping divine power and reshaping the multiverse.  Later official materials claim Asmodeus possesses a piece of the pure elemental chaos Tharizdun used to create the Abyss. The demons are drawn to this and seek to reclaim it.

Tarrasque
The tarrasque is a gigantic lizard-like creature which exists only to eat, kill, and destroy, "the most dreaded monster native to the Prime Material plane". The tarrasque was introduced in 1983 in the Monster Manual II, in the first edition of Advanced Dungeons & Dragons. It is very loosely based upon the French legend of the tarasque.

It has brown skin, with scabs and warts and bits of encrusted dung all over it which are grey in color. Protecting its back and tail is a thick, glossy caramel-colored shell or carapace. It has spikes coming from its chin, the sides of the mouth, the underside of its neck, the elbows of its front arms, and its shell. The creature also has two horns projecting forwards from the top of its head.

The tarrasque's skin is very hard and thick, and provides excellent armor. It is immune or resistant to most offensive magic, and regenerates damage quickly.

The second edition of the game included rules for extracting treasure from the creature's carcass. In the Spelljammer series, the accessory Practical Planetology suggests the tarrasques originate from the planet Falx. Several hundred tarrasques live there, where they feed upon the native Imbul, a lizard-like creature. In the 4th edition of the game, the tarrasque is listed as an "abomination" and classed as a "Gargantuan elemental magical beast"—a living engine of death and destruction created by a primordial race for use as a weapon against the gods.

The tarrasque has been called "a creature that embodies wanton destruction" and "singularly deadly" and been compared to a kaiju. It was ranked No. 2 on the list of the ten best high-level monsters in Dungeons and Dragons 4th Edition For Dummies. Rob Bricken from io9 named the tarrasque as the 10th most memorable D&D monster. Screen Rant compiled a list of the game's "10 Most Powerful (And 10 Weakest) Monsters, Ranked" in 2018, calling this one of the strongest, saying "There are a lot of giant monsters that roam the various Dungeons & Dragons worlds, but none is more feared than the Tarrasque. This creature is an engine of destruction and it can crush entire cities in a single rampage." Backstab reviewer Michaël Croitoriu highlights the tarrasque among the monsters rated upwards from 2nd to 3rd edition, and wishes good luck to the adventurers having the temerity to attack it.

See also
Bestiary
Dungeons & Dragons controversies
List of Advanced Dungeons & Dragons 2nd edition monsters
List of species in fantasy fiction

Notes

References

Further reading
Jacobs, James, Erik Mona, and Ed Stark. Fiendish Codex I: Hordes of the Abyss (Wizards of the Coast, 2006).
Larme, John. Dangerous Games? Censorship and "Child Protection"  (2000).
McComb, Colin. Faces of Evil: The Fiends (TSR, 1997). 
McComb, Colin, Dale Donovan, and Monte Cook. Planes of Conflict (TSR, 1995). 
McComb, Colin, Dori Jean Hein, and Wolfgang Baur. Planes of Law (TSR, 1995). 

Wyatt, James, and Rob Heinsoo. Monstrous Compendium: Monsters of Faerûn (Wizards of the Coast, 2001).
Wyatt, James, Ari Marmell, and C.A. Suleiman.  Heroes of Horror'' (Wizards of the Coast, 2005).

 
Dungeons and Dragons